Georg Hermann Quincke FRSFor HFRSE (November 19, 1834 – January 13, 1924) was a German physicist.

Biography
Born in Frankfurt-on-Oder, Quincke was the son of prominent physician Geheimer Medicinal-Rath Hermann Quincke and the older brother of physician Heinrich Quincke. 

Quincke received his Ph. D. in 1858 at Berlin, having previously studied also at Königsberg and at Heidelberg.  He became privatdocent at Berlin in 1859, professor at Berlin in 1865, professor at Würzburg in 1872, and in 1875 was called to be professor of physics at Heidelberg, where he remained until his retirement in 1907. His doctor's dissertation was on the subject of the capillary constant of mercury, and his investigations of all capillary phenomena are classical.

In September 1860, Quincke was one of the participants in the Karlsruhe Congress, the first international conference of chemistry worldwide. He and Adolf von Baeyer represented the University of Berlin in Congress.

Quincke also did important work in the experimental study of the reflection of light, especially from metallic surfaces, and carried on prolonged researches on the subject of the influence of electric forces upon the constants of different forms of matter, modifying the dissociation hypothesis of Clausius.

 is an apparatus that Quincke built that demonstrates destructive interference of sound waves. It is also known as the Herschel-Quincke Tube; John Herschel had proposed a similar apparatus, but did not build it. The principles of the apparatus are now applied in mufflers and other noise management devices. 

Quincke received a D. C. L. from Oxford and an LL. D. from Cambridge and from Glasgow and was elected an honorary fellow of the Royal Society of London. In 1885 he published Geschichte des physikalischen Instituts der Universität Heidelberg.
  
Quincke died in Heidelberg at age 89. It is believed that Quincke was the last living participant of the Karlsruhe Congress.

Notes

See also
History of cell membrane theory

References
 
 

1834 births
1924 deaths
19th-century German physicists
People from Frankfurt (Oder)
People from the Province of Brandenburg
University of Königsberg alumni
Heidelberg University alumni
Academic staff of Heidelberg University
Humboldt University of Berlin alumni
Academic staff of the Humboldt University of Berlin
Academic staff of the University of Würzburg
Foreign Members of the Royal Society
Members of the Göttingen Academy of Sciences and Humanities